Berrytown is an unincorporated community in Rockingham County, Virginia, United States.

References

Unincorporated communities in Virginia
Unincorporated communities in Rockingham County, Virginia